Andreas Schönbächler (born 24 April 1966) is a Swiss freestyle skier and Olympic champion. He won a gold medal at the 1994 Winter Olympics in Lillehammer.

References

1966 births
Living people
Swiss male freestyle skiers
Freestyle skiers at the 1994 Winter Olympics
Olympic gold medalists for Switzerland
Olympic medalists in freestyle skiing
Medalists at the 1994 Winter Olympics
20th-century Swiss people